The Gant-Hohtälli Aerial Tramway is a large-cab cable car near Zermatt, Switzerland.

External links
Seilbahnen.org website (German)
The Gant-Hohtälli tramway pillar
 

Cable cars in Switzerland
Transport in Zermatt